E. Klein Graff (March 1, 1896 – August 18, 1982) was an American politician. He served as a Republican member of the South Dakota House of Representatives.

Life and career 
Graff served in the United States Army during World War I. He was a lobbyist.

In 1967, Graff was elected to the South Dakota House of Representatives, representing Minnehaha County, South Dakota, serving until 1968.

Graff died in August 1982 at the Royal C. Johnson Veterans Memorial Hospital, at the age of 86.

References 

1896 births
1982 deaths
Republican Party members of the South Dakota House of Representatives
20th-century American politicians